Teleiodes hortensis is a moth of the family Gelechiidae. It is found in China.

Adults are similar to Teleiodes luculella, but can be distinguished by the absence of the large white speckle at the middle of the forewings.

References

Moths described in 1996
Teleiodes